Beaverdale is an unincorporated community in Whitfield County, in the U.S. state of Georgia.

History
The community was named after the North American beaver. A post office called Beaverdale was established in 1873, and remained in operation until 1909. In 1900, the community had 60 inhabitants.

References

Unincorporated communities in Whitfield County, Georgia